Inishbofin (derived from the Irish Inis Bó Finne meaning 'Island of the White Cow') is a small island off the coast of Connemara, County Galway, Ireland. Inishbofin has around 180 inhabitants and is a tourist destination.

Name
The island's English name Inishbofin is derived from the Irish name Inis Bó Finne ('Island of the White Cow'). There are several legends concerning the origins of the island's name. According to one legend, the island was actually a floating place until some fishermen landed on it in a fog. By bringing fire onto the island, they dispelled the magic, fixing it in place. They then saw an old woman driving a white cow, which turned into a rock when the woman struck it with a stick.

The Irish name has also been anglicised as 'Innisboffin' and 'Boffin' or 'Bophin' island.

Geology and topography

It is separated by a narrow channel from Inishark (Shark island).

Much of the island is a Special Area of Conservation (due to the presence of corn crakes and seals). The island has no trees or forests whatsoever. Any wood was cut down and used as heating fuel. Because of the salt-enriched air, trees were never able to re-establish themselves.

History
It is not known when Inishbofin was first settled. There is no evidence of a Mesolithic, and only circumstantial evidence of a significant Neolithic presence. Although there are pre-historic field systems, their age has not been definitely established and could be anywhere between Bronze Age and early Medieval. Neolithic and Bronze Age monuments, found in significant numbers on the Connemara mainland, are conspicuous by their absence. Definite traces of human settlement are available only from the Iron Age onwards, such as the remains of promontory ring forts like 'Dun Mor'.

Around 665, Saint Colmán founded a monastery on Inishbofin. The island's ecclesiastical settlement was attacked by the Vikings in 795. According to some accounts, Guairim of Inisbofin was the ruler of the island when Colmán came here. The Annals of the Four Masters report the monastery's Abbots until the early 10th century (see below).

The island belonged to the O'Flahertys until 1380, when the O'Malleys captured it. In the 16th century, according to local tradition, a Spanish pirate or Barbary corsair named Alonzo Bosco built a stronghold on Port Island, where the Cromwellian fort stands today. According to the tales he raided the Irish coast and shipping in the area. "Don" Bosco was supposed to have been an ally of Gráinne O'Malley, chieftain of the O'Malley clan and 'Ireland's pirate queen'. One story had them stretching a defensive iron chain across Inishbofin's harbour entrance to make it impassable to enemy ships. Across the harbour entrance from Port Island sits 'Dún Gráinne', the fort where Gráinne O'Malley supposedly lived.

Eventually, Elizabethean forces took the island. In 1609, both Inishbofin and Inishark were the property of the Earl (or Marquis) of Clanricard (alternatively spelled Clanricarde or Clanrickard). The Marquis was of the de Burgo (Burke) family.

In the years of war following the Irish rebellion of 1641, the island was an important staging posts for arms deliveries to the Irish Catholic rebels and their allies, the Royalists, from the Duke of Lorraine. The Royalists were supporters of King Charles I of England in the English Civil War against the Parliamentarians. In August 1649, the Parliamentarian forces under Oliver Cromwell had landed in Ireland and over the next few years conquered it. In early 1653, Cromwellian warships threatened to bombard the island and Inishbofin surrendered on 14 February to Sir John Reynolds. It was thus one of the last Royalist strongholds to fall to Cromwell's army. According to some accounts, after Galway had fallen in 1652, Rory O'Moore, one of the initiators of the 1641 rebellion fled to Inishbofin, where he lived in a cave.

After taking the island, the Parliamentary forces turned Inishbofin into a prison for Catholic priests arrested elsewhere in Ireland. Most of the star fort commanding the harbour dates from this period. It is known today as "Cromwell's Barracks" and was used, aside from its role as a prison, to protect the harbour against pirates and Dutch raiders (with whom the Protectorate was at war). At the time, a considerable fishery and whaling activity was based on the island.

In 1690, the fort was garrisoned during the Williamite War in Ireland by Jacobites, supporters of King James II of England. Commanded by one Colonel O'Riordan, they surrendered to King William's forces soon after the fall of Galway in 1691.

In 1779, a British ship carrying officers and new recruits of the 84th Regiment of Foot and the King's Orange Rangers, diverted from their planned course from Newfoundland to New York City during the American War of Independence, was blown off course and wrecked at Inishbofin (Royal Oak Cove). 56 of the soldiers died, many of the survivors deserted and were hunted down by troops from Westport.

Around 1830, Inishbofin passed from the possession of the Clanricards to the Browne family of Westport, descendants of the O'Malleys. In 1837, the island was in the Barony of Murrisk, County of Mayo, and Province of Connaught. It belonged to Howe Browne, 2nd Marquess of Sligo.

Circa 1855, George Browne sold the island to Henry William Wilberforce. Cyril Allies, an English Catholic, bought it from Wilberforce in 1876, after having held it in mortgage since 1859. It was eventually acquired by the Congested Districts Board for Ireland (later known as the Land Commission). The exact date is not known, but negotiations were "well advanced" by 1910.

As of 1 February 1873, Inishbofin (as in the Civil Parish of Inishbofin which included Inishark as well) was no longer legally part of County Mayo but had become a part of County Galway. this was a consequence of a severe localised famine in the winter of 1872/3 which necessitated relief be organised via the nearer Poor Law Union based in Clifden Workhouse rather than the previously responsible Poor Law Union based around Louisburgh Workhouse and in view of the particular concentration of distress in West Connemara and Inishbofin/Inishark.

In 1890, the island was visited by academics Alfred Cort Haddon and Andrew Francis Dixon (who later became Professor of Anatomy at Trinity College Dublin), who removed partial skeletal remains of 13 people, including their skulls, from St Colman's monastery on the island without the knowledge or permission of the community. They did so for the purposes of studying craniometry. Since then the remains have been stored in TCD's old anatomy museum. In 2023, it was reported that more than 150 current residents on Inisbofin had signed a petition calling for the return of the remains and condemning "the criminal nature of how these remains came into the possession of Trinity College in the first place". In February 2023, the provost of Trinity College, Dr Linda Doyle, apologised for the upset caused by the university's possession of the remains, and said the university would now consult with islanders on the most appropriate way to return them.

Demographics 
The table below reports data on Inishbofin's population taken from Discover the Islands of Ireland (Alex Ritsema, Collins Press, 1999) and the Census of Ireland. Censuses in Ireland before 1841 are not considered complete and/or reliable.

The island's population has shrunk dramatically since pre-famine times. In 1837, 1462 people lived on Inishbofin. By 1881, the number was down to 959. In 1990, there were around 200 inhabitants, the 2011 Census found just 160 inhabitants.

Today, tourism is the island's main industry. There are three hotels and a hostel on the island. Inishbofin offers scuba diving, walking trails, cycling, horse riding, sailing, paddle boarding, kayaking, snorkelling, shore and sea angling.

Transport
Inishbofin can be reached by ferry from the pier in Cleggan. There is also a helipad, and an airstrip has been built on the island. However, despite the Inishbofin and Cleggan airfields costing almost EUR10 million to build and continuing to cost hundreds of thousands annually to maintain, neither airstrip is licensed for use and general aviation pilots are forbidden to land on them.

Culture and sports
The island features a football pitch and a community centre with an indoor sports hall. It also houses a small island library which provides a reference and local studies collection with information on the history and heritage of the area.

Inishbofin hosted the 2008 All-Ireland Islands Football Tournament, and again in September 2017. The current Galway Senior Men's Football team goalkeeper, Ruairi Lavelle, hails from Inishbofin. Another islander, Michael Day, also made his debut in midfield for the Senior team in 2017.

Landmarks

 Cromwell's Barracks
 St. Colmán's Cemetery (ruins of a 13th-century church at the site of the 7th century monastery)
 Light on Gun Rock (built in 1909). It was "swept away" by a storm on 3 January 2014.
 Dún Mór promontory ring fort 
 Dún Gráinne 
 The Stags seal colony

Literature
The short story "The Hungry Death", written by Rosa Mulholland around 1880, is set in Inishbofin during the Great Famine. The story focuses on a love triangle before the backdrop of the famine and depicts the suffering and dying of the island population. It was republished in the collection The Art of the Glimpse: 100 Irish Short Stories (2020), edited by Sinéad Gleeson. Inishbofin was mentioned at some length by Irish artist and author Robert Gibbings, writing in 1946. He also referred in passing to some Inishbofin placenames that appear to be no longer extant, suggesting that the villages have now vanished. These include: Alladoon, Bunamullen, Cooltra, Mweelanbwee, Ooghnagunnel. Nobel Laureate Seamus Heaney's poem "Seeing Things" begins with a boat ride to Inishbofin. "Inishbofin on a Sunday Morning. / Sunlight, turfsmoke, seagulls, boatslip, diesel". The island served as the setting for Deborah Tall's 1987 book, The Island of the White Cow. Richard Murphy wrote several poems about his time on Inishbofin, best known perhaps is' Sailing to an Island'.

Inishbofin in the Annals
 668 - Colmán of Lindisfarne founds the monastery of Inis Bó Finne.
 675 - Death of Colmán of Lindisfarne on Inis Bó Finne
 711 - Baetan, Bishop of Inis Bo Finne, died.
 755 - Mael Turaig, abbot of Inis Bó Finne, rested.
 795 - The plundering of Í Coluim Chille, and of Inis Muiredaig, and of Inis Bó Finne.
 898 - Caenchomhrac, of the caves of Inis Bo Fine, died.
 809 - Blathmac of Inis Bó Finne, died.
 916 - Abbot Feardhach of Inis Bó Finne, died.

See also
 List of abbeys and priories in the Republic of Ireland (County Galway)
 Scaithin
 Leo of Inis Airc
 Repatriation and reburial of Irish human remains

Gallery

References

External links

 Inishbofin Island Website
 Article on archaeological work on the island

Islands of County Galway